Ewa Brodzka is a Polish film maker, production manager, assistant director, second unit director, television director, and casting director. She has worked on many Polish feature films and television series. Notable is her working relationship as first assistant director and production manager with Academy Award winning director  Andrzej Wajda.
She has worked on many international productions made in Poland including Roman Polanski's The Pianist and Steven Spielberg's Schindler's List.

She is married to film director Marek Brodzki.

Selected filmography

Feature films:

 2009 Tatarak - with director Andrzej Wajda - Production Manager, Casting Director
 2007 Katyń - Academy Award nominated film with director Andrzej Wajda - Second Unit Director, Casting Director
 2007 Jutro Idziemy Do Kina - award-winning film with director Michał Kwieciński - Second Unit Director, Casting Director
 2006 Strike (Strajk) - with director Volker Schlöndorff - Casting Director
 2003 The Revenge (Zemsta) - with director Andrzej Wajda - Asst. Director
 2002 The Pianist - with director Roman Polanski - Second Asst. Director
 2001 Wiedźmin (The Hexer) - Casting Director
 1999 Pan Tadeusz - with director Andrzej Wajda - Second Unit Director
 1988 And the Violins Stopped Playing - with director Alexander Ramati - Production Organizer

Television:

 2008 Teraz Albo Nigdy - series - Casting Director, Second Unit Director
 2008 Czas Honoru - series - Casting Director, Second Unit Director
 2007 Twarzą w Twarz - series - Casting Director, Second Unit Director
 2005-2007 Magda M. - series - Casting Director
 2002 Wiedźmin (The Hexer) - series - Casting Director

External links
Ewa Brodzka at the Filmpolski Database
 

1959 births
Living people
Polish film directors
Polish women film directors
Casting directors
Women casting directors